The 5th Tank Brigade is a reserve armored formation of the Ukrainian Ground Forces.

History

Formation
The brigade was formed in 2016, initially equipped with 30 T-72 tanks. From late March to early April, the brigade took part in large scale exercises of Operational Command South, held in Kherson Oblast. The goal of the exercise was to improve elements of overall defense of the region. At the end of the exercise it was announced, that Brigade will be stationed close to border with occupied Crimea.

2022 Russian invasion of Ukraine
When on 24 February 2022, Russia invaded Ukraine, the unit was deployed to the southwestern part of the country near Odesa. As of May, it was still in the Odessa area. After receiving T-72M1 tanks from Poland and YPR-765 APCs from the Netherlands, the brigade was moved from the front into the Ukrainian strategic reserve.

David Axe writing for Forbes, suggested that Brigade was inactive in August 2022. However, Brigade was mentioned by President Volodymyr Zelenskyy in his 200 day of war speech on 11 September 2022.

Current structure 
As of 2022 the brigade's structure is as follows:
 1st Tank Battalion
 2nd Tank Battalion
 3rd Tank Battalion
 Mechanized Battalion
 Brigade Artillery Group
 Headquarters & Target Acquisition Battery
 Self-propelled Artillery Battalion (2S3 Akatsiya)
 Self-propelled Artillery Battalion (2S1 Gvozdika)
 Rocket Artillery Battalion (BM-21 Grad)
 Anti-Aircraft Missile Artillery Battalion
 Logistic Battalion

Past commanders

References

Brigades of the Ukrainian Ground Forces
Armoured brigades of Ukraine
Military units and formations of the 2022 Russian invasion of Ukraine
Military units and formations of Ukraine